The 1936 Louisiana gubernatorial election was held on January 21, 1936.  Like most Southern states between the Reconstruction Era and the Civil Rights Movement, Louisiana's Republican Party was virtually nonexistent in terms of electoral support. This meant that the Democratic Party primary held on this date was the real contest over who would be governor.  The election resulted in the victory of Richard W. Leche of New Orleans as governor. Leche was supported by the Longite faction of the party and Cleveland Dear of Alexandria by the anti-Longs' "Home Rule" ticket. State Representative Mason Spencer of Tallulah dropped out of the race and endorsed Dear, but the ballots had already been printed, and he received nearly two thousand votes.

Results  
Democratic Party Primary, January 21

Sources 
State of Louisiana.  Compilation of Primary Election Returns of the Democratic Party, State of Louisiana, 1936.

1936
Gubernatorial
Louisiana
January 1936 events